Russellville is a census-designated place and unincorporated community in Berkeley County, South Carolina, United States. Its population was 488 as of the 2010 census.

Demographics

References

Census-designated places in South Carolina
Unincorporated communities in South Carolina
Census-designated places in Berkeley County, South Carolina
Unincorporated communities in Berkeley County, South Carolina